Mahendragarh is a city and a municipal committee in Mahendragarh district in the Indian state of Haryana.

Etymology 
Earlier named kanaud, in early 1860s it was renamed after Maharaja Mahendra Singh (r. 1721-1748 CE) of Patiala State who was gifted this area by the British East India Company rule for his help in crushing the Indian Rebellion of 1857.

Geography
It has an average elevation of 262 metres (859 feet). Mahendragarh district is bounded on the north by Charkhi DadriBhiwani and jhajjar districts, on the east by Rewari district and Alwar district of Rajasthan, on the south by Alwar, Jaipur and Sikar districts of Rajasthan, and on the west by Sikar and Jhunjhunu districts of Rajasthan. It has five tehsils of Kanina, Narnaul, Ateli, Nangal Choudhary And Mahendergarh.

It is situated at the bank of Dohan River (which was a seasonal river), which is at the verge of extinction.

History

Fort of Kanod was built by Maratha ruler Tatya Tope in 1755 CE. In 1860, it came under the Patiala State during the British raj. ruler of Patiala, Narendra Singh, changed the name of Kanod Fort to Mahandragarh after his son Mahendra. Because of the name of the fort, this town came to be known as Mahendragarh and the name of Narnaul Nizam was changed to Mahendragarh Nizam.

It is said that Malik Mahadud Khan, a servant of [Babar]] had settled a habitation here. 

In 1948, with the formation of PEPSU, Mahendragarh territory from Patiala State, Dadri territory (Now Charkhi Dadri) from Jind and Bawal territory from Nabha State were constituted into Mahendragarh district with the headquarters at Narnaul. At that time, there were three tehsils, namely; Narnaul, Charkhi Dadri and Bawal and Mahendragarh was a sub-tehsil. 

In 1949, Mahendragarh sub-tehsil was made a tehsil. In 1950, Bawal tehsil was broken up and 78 villages were transferred to Gurgaon district forming Bawal as a sub-tehsil and remaining villages were added to Narnaul and Mahendragarh. In 1956 the Rewari tehsil (except 61 villages ) was excluded from Gurgaon district and included in Mahendragarh district. The Charkhi-Dadri sub-division was excluded from Mahendragarh district and included in the newly constituted district of Bhiwani. In 1977, 81 villages of Rewari tehsil was constituted into Bawal tehsil. In 1978 the district comprised 4 tehsils (Mahendragarh, Rewari, Narnaul and Bawal). On 1 November 1989, Rewari and Bawal tehsils (taken from Mahendragarh district) and Kosli tehsil except 10 villages (taken from Rohtak district) were constituted into a new district of Rewari. Presently Mahendragarh district has 3 sub-divisions (Kanina, Narnaul and Mahendergarh), 5 tehsils (Kanina, Mahendragarh, Nangal Chaudhary, Ateli, Narnaul) and 1 sub-tehsil (Satnali).

Demographics
As of 2011 India census, Mahendragarh had a population of 23,977. Males constitute 53% of the population and females 47%. Mahendragarh has an average literacy rate of 76, higher than the national average of 75%: male literacy is 89%, and female literacy is 67%. In Mahendragarh, 14% of the population is under 6 years of age. Hindus constitute 98% of the population.

In spite of being a district headquarters, there is no administrative office. All the relevant work is done in Narnaul. The very first guggul (Commiphora wightii) vatika (place where medicinal plants are planted) was established here.

Now many government offices have opened in Mahendragarh near Government Boys college in new Court.

Social groups
According to Haryana District Gazetteers: Mahendragarh Ahirs form the agricultural backbone of the district. However Yaduvanshi Ahirs are in majority in the district.

Notable personalities
 Swami Ramdev - Yoga Guru and Co founder of Patanjali Ayurved
 Rao Tula Ram - freedom fighter
 Gujarmal Modi - founder of Modi Industries and Modi Nagar
 Satish Kaushik - Indian film director, producer and actor

References